This is a list of the main career statistics of American professional tennis player Amanda Anisimova.

Performance timelines

Only main-draw results in WTA Tour, Grand Slam tournaments, Fed Cup/Billie Jean King Cup and Olympic Games are included in win–loss records.

Singles
Current through the 2023 Indian Wells Open.

Doubles
Current after the 2021 season.

WTA career finals

Singles: 3 (2 titles, 1 runner-up)

ITF finals

Singles: 4 (1 title, 3 runner-ups)

ITF Junior Circuit

Junior Grand Slam finals

Singles: 2 (1 title, 1 runner-up)

ITF Junior finals

Singles: 7 (5 titles, 2 runner–ups)

WTA Tour career earnings
Current after the 2022 Wimbledon.

Career Grand Slam statistics

Grand Slam tournament seedings
Tournaments won by Anisimova are in boldface, and advanced into finals by Anisimova are in italics.

Best Grand Slam results details 
Grand Slam winners are in boldface, and runner–ups are in italics.

Singles

Record against top players

Record against top 10 players
Anisimova's record against players who have been ranked in the top 10. Active players are in boldface.

Top 10 wins

Notes

References

Anisimova